Aron John Baynes (born 9 December 1986) is an Australian professional basketball player for the Brisbane Bullets of the National Basketball League (NBL). He played college basketball for Washington State University before starting his professional career in Europe. In 2013, he joined the San Antonio Spurs, and a year later, won an NBA championship with the Spurs. He has also played with the Detroit Pistons, Boston Celtics, Phoenix Suns, and Toronto Raptors. Baynes also plays for the Australian national team.

Early life
Baynes was born in Gisborne, New Zealand to New Zealand parents in 1986. His family moved to the relatively small Australian town of Mareeba, Queensland when he was three years of age. He grew up playing rugby league in Far North Queensland while attending Mareeba State High School until the age of 15 when his older brother, Callum, introduced him to basketball. As a result, Baynes decided to focus on pursuing a career in basketball and subsequently quit rugby league. Shortly after high school graduation, he joined the Australian Institute of Sport in 2004–05 and accepted a college scholarship offer from Tony Bennett to play for Washington State University in 2006. During his college career under Bennett, Washington State tied the school wins record twice consecutively, going 26–8 in 2006–07 and 26–9 in 2007–08.

Professional career

Europe (2009–2013)
On 29 May 2009, Baynes signed a two-year deal with Lietuvos Rytas of the Lithuanian Basketball League. In July 2009, he played for the Los Angeles Lakers' Summer League team. Following the 2009–10 season, he parted ways with Lietuvos Rytas.

On 15 July 2010, Baynes signed a two-year deal with EWE Baskets Oldenburg of the German Basketball Bundesliga. In 40 games for Oldenburg in 2010–11, he averaged 6.8 points and 3.7 rebounds per game. On 29 June 2011, he parted ways with Oldenburg.

On 24 August 2011, Baynes signed a one-year deal with Ikaros Kallitheas of the Greek Basket League.

On 1 August 2012, Baynes signed a one-year deal with Union Olimpija of the Slovenian Basketball League. On 5 January 2013, he played his final game for Olimpija, as he later left the team in pursuit of an NBA contract.

San Antonio Spurs (2013–2015)
On 23 January 2013, Baynes signed with the San Antonio Spurs. In his second NBA game, Baynes recorded seven points, nine rebounds and one block in a 102–78 win over the Charlotte Bobcats. During the 2012–13 season, he was assigned multiple times to the Austin Toros of the NBA Development League. He made his first NBA start in Game 4 of the Spurs' first-round playoff match-up against the Los Angeles Lakers, and was tasked with defending Dwight Howard. The Spurs went on to reach the 2013 NBA Finals but lost the series in seven games to the Miami Heat.

On 1 December 2013, Baynes was reassigned to the Austin Toros. He was recalled on 2 December, reassigned on 8 December, and recalled again on 9 December. On 6 May 2014, he recorded playoff career-high numbers of 10 points and seven rebounds in a 116–92 win over the Portland Trail Blazers in Game 1 of the Western Conference semi-finals. Baynes went on to help the Spurs defeat the Miami Heat 4–1 in the 2014 NBA Finals to claim his first NBA championship.

On 26 September 2014, Baynes re-signed with the Spurs. On 20 December 2014, he scored a then career-high 16 points while starting in place of Tim Duncan in a 99–93 loss to the Dallas Mavericks. On 1 April 2015 and 3 April 2015, Baynes had back-to-back 18-point games.

Detroit Pistons (2015–2017)

On 12 July 2015, Baynes signed with the Detroit Pistons. On 19 March 2016, he scored a career-high 21 points in a 115–103 win over the Brooklyn Nets.

On 14 November 2016, Baynes scored 20 points against the Oklahoma City Thunder while starting in place of Andre Drummond. On 19 March 2017, Baynes grabbed a career-high 17 rebounds alongside 13 points in a 112–95 win over the Phoenix Suns.

Boston Celtics (2017–2019)
On 19 July 2017, Baynes signed with the Boston Celtics. In a game against the Charlotte Hornets, Baynes injured Celtics teammate and star point guard Kyrie Irving. On 8 November 2017, he matched his career high with 21 points in a 107–96 win over the Los Angeles Lakers. In the Celtics' regular season finale on 11 April 2018, Baynes led a short-handed Boston lineup with a career-best 26 points and 14 rebounds in a 110–97 win over the Brooklyn Nets.

On 7 July 2018, Baynes re-signed with the Celtics. On 19 December 2018, in a 111–103 loss to the Phoenix Suns, Baynes broke a bone in his left hand. He was subsequently ruled out for four to six weeks. He returned to action on 16 January 2019 against the Toronto Raptors. On 3 February, he was sidelined with a left foot contusion.

Phoenix Suns (2019–2020)
On 6 July 2019, Baynes, along with the draft rights to Ty Jerome, was traded to the Phoenix Suns for a 2020 protected first-round pick. After Deandre Ayton was suspended for 25 games due to diuretic usage on 24 October, Baynes was promoted to being the team's starting center during that period of time. On 30 October, Baynes recorded 24 points, 12 rebounds, and a career-high 7 assists in a 121–110 win over the Golden State Warriors. On 6 March 2020, Baynes scored 37 points and hit nine three-pointers, both career-highs, along with 16 rebounds, in a 127–117 victory over the Portland Trail Blazers. He not only tied a franchise record for most three-pointers made in a single game, but he also joins James Harden as the only other player to record 35+ points, 15+ rebounds, and 9 three-pointers in a single game.

On 23 June 2020, the Suns reported that two of their own players tested positive for COVID-19. In an interview on 22 July, Baynes revealed himself as one of the two players to test positive for COVID-19. Unlike his other teammate that tested positive, Baynes did rejoin the team in the 2020 NBA Bubble until after the scrimmage games were finished, making sure he completely tested negative for the virus before entering the bubble. Because of his late entry and subsequent quarantine period, he was not able to play on 31 July against the Washington Wizards. After recovering from the virus, Baynes was later diagnosed with a right knee contusion, leaving him out of action for the rest of the resumed regular season. Despite being out of action for most of the game, Baynes was considered clear to play for the team's last game of the season, but decided against it despite the blowout 128–102 win over the Dallas Mavericks, ending the resumed season with an 8–0 record.

Toronto Raptors (2020–2021)
On 25 November 2020, the Toronto Raptors signed Baynes to a multi-year contract. On 31 January 2021, Baynes had eight points and a season-high 16 rebounds in a 115–102 win against the Orlando Magic. On 4 August 2021, he was waived by the Raptors.

Brisbane Bullets (2022–present)
After suffering a career-threatening spinal cord injury during the Tokyo Olympics, Baynes returned to professional basketball by signing a two-year deal with the Brisbane Bullets of the National Basketball League on 28 July 2022.

National team career
Baynes has played for the Australian national team, the Boomers, at the 2010 FIBA World Championship in Turkey, the 2012 Summer Olympics in London, the 2014 FIBA Basketball World Cup in Spain, the 2016 Summer Olympics in Rio de Janeiro, and the 2019 FIBA Basketball World Cup in China. Baynes was also part of the national team for the 2020 Summer Olympics in Tokyo, but a spinal cord injury ruled him out for the second half of the tournament as the Boomers went on to win the bronze medal.

Baynes' injury at the Tokyo Olympics was much more serious than had initially been reported, and as of January 2022, he was still recovering with hopes of returning to the NBA.

Career statistics

NBA

Regular season

|-
| style="text-align:left;"|
| style="text-align:left;"|San Antonio
| 16 || 0 || 8.8 || .500 || .000 || .583 || 2.0 || .3 || .1 || .4 || 2.7
|-
| style="text-align:left; background:#AFE6BA;"|
| style="text-align:left;"|San Antonio
| 53 || 4 || 9.3 || .436 ||  || .905 || 2.7 || .6 || .0 || .1 || 3.0
|-
| style="text-align:left;"|
| style="text-align:left;"|San Antonio
| 70 || 17 || 16.0 || .566 || .250 || .865 || 4.5 || .5 || .2 || .3 || 6.6
|-
| style="text-align:left;"|
| style="text-align:left;"|Detroit
| 81 || 1 || 15.2 || .505 || .000 || .764 || 4.7 || .6 || .3 || .6 || 6.3
|-
| style="text-align:left;"|
| style="text-align:left;"|Detroit
| 75 || 2 || 15.5 || .513 ||  || .840 || 4.4 || .4 || .2 || .5 || 4.9
|-
| style="text-align:left;"|
| style="text-align:left;"|Boston
| 81 || 67 || 18.3 || .471 || .143 || .756 || 5.4 || 1.1 || .3 || .6 || 6.0
|-
| style="text-align:left;"|
| style="text-align:left;"|Boston
| 51 || 18 || 16.1 || .471 || .344 || .855 || 4.7 || 1.1 || .2 || .7 || 5.6
|-
| style="text-align:left;"|
| style="text-align:left;"|Phoenix
| 42 || 28 || 22.2 || .480 || .351 || .747 || 5.6 || 1.6 || .2 || .5 || 11.5
|- 
| style="text-align:left;"|
| style="text-align:left;"|Toronto
| 53 || 31 || 18.5 || .441 || .262 || .707 || 5.2 || .9 || .3 || .4 || 6.1
|- class="sortbottom"
| style="text-align:center;" colspan="2"|Career 
| 522 || 168 || 16.0 || .489 || .308 || .794 || 4.6 || .8 || .2 || .5 || 6.0

Playoffs

|-
| style="text-align:left;"|2013
| style="text-align:left;"|San Antonio
| 4 || 1 || 5.8 || .571 ||  ||  || 1.3 || .0 || .0 || .0 || 2.0
|-
| style="text-align:left; background:#afe6ba;"|2014
| style="text-align:left;"| San Antonio
| 14 || 0 || 7.2 || .500 || .000 || .800 || 2.2 || .0 || .2 || .0 || 2.3
|-
| style="text-align:left;"|2015
| style="text-align:left;"|San Antonio
| 4 || 0 || 10.0 || .300 ||  || 1.000 || 2.5 || .3 || .0 || .0 || 2.3
|-
| style="text-align:left;"|2016
| style="text-align:left;"|Detroit
| 4 || 0 || 11.0 || .444 ||  || .667 || 2.0 || .5 || .0 || .0 || 2.5
|-
| style="text-align:left;"|2018
| style="text-align:left;"|Boston
| 19 || 12 || 20.5 || .506 || .478 || .722 || 6.2 || 1.0 || .2 || .6 || 6.0
|-
| style="text-align:left;"|2019
| style="text-align:left;"|Boston
| 9 || 5 || 12.8 || .571 || .333 || .500 || 2.8 || .3 || .3 || .3 || 2.1
|- class="sortbottom"
| style="text-align:center;" colspan="2"|Career 
| 54 || 18 || 13.2 || .497 || .433 || .750 || 3.6 || .5 || .2 || .3 || 3.6

College

|-
| style="text-align:left;"|2005–06
| style="text-align:left;"|Washington State
| 28 || 12 || 16.5 || .429 || .000 || .641 || 4.1 || 0.1 || 0.2 || 0.5 || 5.2
|-
| style="text-align:left;"|2006–07
| style="text-align:left;"|Washington State
| 26 || 7 || 16.4 || .495 ||  || .646 || 3.1 || 0.1 || 0.2 || 0.4 || 5.2
|-
| style="text-align:left;"|2007–08
| style="text-align:left;"|Washington State
| 35 || 34 || 24.0 || .600 || .000 || .660 || 6.0 || 0.3 || 0.7 || 0.7 || 10.4
|-
| style="text-align:left;"|2008–09
| style="text-align:left;"|Washington State
| 33 || 33 || 28.8 || .580 || 1.000 || .774 || 7.5 || 0.6 || 0.3 || 1.3 || 12.7
|- class="sortbottom"
| style="text-align:center;" colspan="2"|Career
| 122 || 86 || 22.0 || .546 || .333 || .698 || 5.4 || 0.3 || 0.3 || 0.8 || 8.7

EuroLeague

|-
| style="text-align:left;"|2009–10
| style="text-align:left;"|Lietuvos Rytas
| 10 || 8 || 13.3 || .511 || .000 || .643 || 3.0 || .2 || .4 || .9 || 5.5 || 3.0
|-
| style="text-align:left;"|2012–13
| style="text-align:left;"|Union Olimpija
| 10 || 10 || 26.2 || .587 || .000 || .698 || 9.8 || .5 || .5 || .5 || 13.8 || 18.2
|- class="sortbottom"
| style="text-align:center;" colspan="2"|Career
| 20 || 18 || 19.8 || .562 || .000 || .684 || 6.4 || .4 || .5 || .7 || 9.7 || 10.6

See also

References

External links

  and EuroLeague and Washington State Cougars
 Aron Baynes at Official Site of the 2012 Australian Olympic Team
 
 
 

1986 births
Living people
2010 FIBA World Championship players
2014 FIBA Basketball World Cup players
2019 FIBA Basketball World Cup players
Austin Toros players
Australian expatriate basketball people in Germany
Australian expatriate basketball people in Greece
Australian expatriate basketball people in Lithuania
Australian expatriate basketball people in the United States
Australian Institute of Sport basketball players
Australian men's basketball players
Australian people of New Zealand descent
Basketball players at the 2012 Summer Olympics
Basketball players at the 2016 Summer Olympics
Basketball players at the 2020 Summer Olympics
BC Rytas players
Boston Celtics players
Brisbane Bullets players
Centers (basketball)
Detroit Pistons players
EWE Baskets Oldenburg players
Australian expatriate basketball people in Slovenia
Ikaros B.C. players
KK Olimpija players
Medalists at the 2020 Summer Olympics
National Basketball Association players from Australia
Olympic basketball players of Australia
Olympic bronze medalists for Australia
Olympic medalists in basketball
Sportspeople from Cairns
Phoenix Suns players
Power forwards (basketball)
San Antonio Spurs players
Sportspeople from Gisborne, New Zealand
Sportsmen from Queensland
Toronto Raptors players
Undrafted National Basketball Association players
Washington State Cougars men's basketball players
Australian expatriate basketball people in Canada